Qinghai Huading Industrial Co., Ltd. known as Qinghai Huading or just QHHD, is a holding company established in 1998 and listed on the Shanghai Stock Exchange in 2000.  As of 12 June 2015, the company has a market capitalization of 4.682 billion CNY and employs over 4,000 staffs.  Through its various subsidiaries, the company is involved mainly in the manufacturing and distribution of machine tools, gearboxes, food machineries, elevator components and LED lightings.

Operations 
The group's core business is the manufacturing of machine tools.  As of 2012, Qinghai Huading is the domestic market leader in horizontal machine tools in terms of output volume and has over 90% domestic market share in rail road specific machine tools.

Subsidiaries and Affiliates 
Qinghai Huading Heavy Machine Tools Company Limited.
QInghai Maoyuan Trading Company Limited.
Qinghai One Machine Numerical Control Machine Tool Company Limited.
Jiangyuan Precision Machinery Company Limited.
Guangdong Jingchuang Machinery Manufacturing Company Limited.
Guangzhou Hongli Machine Tools Company Limited.
Guangdong Henglian Food Machinery Company Limited.
Guangdong Zhonglong Communications Technology Limited.

Directors & Officers 
Shiguang Yu - Chairman of the Board
Shanpeng Xiao - Chief Financial Officer
Yongjun Yang - General Manager, Director
Fubin Liu - Deputy General Manager
Dong Zhai - Deputy General Manager
Wenzhong Liu - Secretary of the Board, Deputy General Manager, Director
Yuenan Li - Staff Elected Director
Baoshan Ding - Independent Director
Yuanju Ma - Independent Director
Jianjun Wang - Independent Director
Yong Xu - Independent Director
Xuetong Yang - Independent Director
Officers and Directors data as of Feb 17 2013

External links

References

Holding companies of China
Companies listed on the Shanghai Stock Exchange
Companies based in Xining
Conglomerate companies of China
Holding companies established in 1998